Jordan Woolley (born October 1, 1981) is an American actor who as appeared on television and film, including on As the World Turns. Woolley attended the Lee Strasberg Theatre Institute in New York. Prior to acting, Woolley spent two years as a business major at Castleton State College in Vermont.

Life
Woolley was born on October 1, 1981, in West Long Branch, New Jersey.  Growing up, Woolley was an active Boy Scout in Troop 145 in West Long Branch. He is the youngest of three children with an older brother and sister in addition to a large extended family. Woolley is a 1999 graduate of Shore Regional High School in West Long Branch.

Appearances
The Beautiful Life (2009) - Egan Russo
Breaking Point (2009) - Wayne
Nite Tales: The Movie (2008) - Tom
CSI: Miami (episode: Just Murdered) (2007) -  Paul Warner
As the World Turns (2005-2006) - Nick Kasnoff

Notes

References
Jordan Woolley article in CBS Soaps in Depth magazine 9/2008

External links
Jordan Woolley Myspace Actor Page 
Jordan Woolley Facebook Actor Profile

1981 births
Living people
American male soap opera actors
People from West Long Branch, New Jersey
Male actors from New Jersey
Castleton State College alumni